FL Goodwin was an American aircraft manufacturer that was based in Phoenix, Arizona. The company specialized in the design and manufacturer of powered parachutes.

The company introduced its first model, the Goodwin Tri-Moto in 1997, a unique design of powered parachute carriage that can be folded up to stow on top of a recreational vehicle, in a small pick-up truck or even in a small boat. The design goal was to eliminate the need for a trailer for ground transportation and to simplify storage requirements.

The following year the company introduced the Goodwin Buckshot, a more conventional powered parachute design.

Aircraft

References

Defunct aircraft manufacturers of the United States
Powered parachutes